Sołtysi is a river of Poland, a tributary of the Siedliczka.

Rivers of Poland